BTS World Tour: Love Yourself, commonly known as the Love Yourself World Tour, was the third worldwide concert tour headlined by South Korean band BTS to promote their Love Yourself series, including their Love Yourself: Her EP, Love Yourself: Tear studio album, and Love Yourself: Answer compilation album. The tour began on August 25, 2018, in South Korea. A stadium extension to the tour, titled BTS World Tour Love Yourself: Speak Yourself, was added on February 9, 2019, and began in Pasadena, California on May 4, 2019. The tour concluded on October 29, 2019, comprising 62 concerts in 14 countries. The Love Yourself World Tour ranked at number three on Billboard's 2019 Year End Top 40 Tours chart worldwide, with a worldwide gross of $196.4 million from the last 42 shows of the tour. In total, the tour was attended by 2,019,800 people, becoming BTS' most successful tour to date and the highest-grossing concert tour by an act that performs primarily in a non-English language, as reported by Billboard.

Background 
On April 26, 2018, Big Hit Entertainment released a trailer on their official YouTube channel announcing an upcoming world tour. The video revealed an initial schedule of 22 concerts across 11 cities worldwide. After the announcement, multiple hashtags trended worldwide on social media, including the tour's namesake tag— #LOVE_YOURSELF, highlighting the level of anticipation surrounding the event.

Reception

Commercial 
In May 2018, after the first round of North American ticket pre-sales sold out in seconds, a fourth show at Los Angeles' Staples Center was added to the tour due to overwhelming fan demand. Tickets for the Hamilton shows sold out in just over an hour, with organizers for the Ontario stop, Core Entertainment, revealing they would have sold out faster if not for the strain put on Ticketmaster's online system due to the unprecedented heavy influx of site traffic. All fourteen North American stops completely sold out, prompting the addition of a fifteenth and final stop of the North American leg at New York's Citi Field. The concert sold out in under ten minutes, making BTS the first Korean artist to headline a stadium show in the United States. The London, Amsterdam, Berlin, and Paris arena stops, marking the group's first and biggest headlining shows in Europe at the time, also met commercial success with the London dates selling out in two minutes and the Berlin shows selling out in nine minutes. After the second general sale for Seoul's Seoul Olympic Stadium dates opened in August, all 90,000 available tickets sold out. Estimated to have sold a total of 790,000 tickets from 33 sold-out shows in 16 cities, BTS added eight additional Asia dates while touring the European leg of the tour. The first K-pop artists to play at Singapore's National Stadium, tickets sold out in less than four hours.

According to ticket resale site StubHub, BTS was one of 2018's best selling live artists in international markets outside the United States, second to only Ed Sheeran. Variety named BTS as one of the top touring acts of Fall 2018 in the United States, entering StubHub's "highest-selling act" and "best-selling shows" lists with the "highest-selling average sales per show position". According to Yahoo! Finance, BTS were also the top-selling act and top-selling show in Canada for Fall 2018. In Japan, BTS came in as the nineteenth best-selling touring act on Nikkei Entertainment's 2018 Concert Mobilization Ranking Top 50.

Critical 
The Love Yourself received positive reviews from critics. For the first concerts in America, local media reported in Los Angeles since the moment fans started to camp outside the Staples Center days ahead the concert. Philip Cosores from Uproxx described BTS' Staples Center 4 night concerts as "Enormous, multi-sensory experience" bringing an "Inclusive" and "Multicultural experience" where music is above any language barrier. Tiffany Taylor from The Hollywood Reporter noted for Billboard News the "Amazing choreography" praising the solo performances and energy of the fans as highlight of the night. Jim Harrington from The Mercury News referred to the Oracle Arena concert on Oakland as "the hottest concert of the year in the Bay Area" noting the solo performances as "witnessing seven individual stars, each of whom could enjoy a successful solo career." For the Chicago show critic Kim Youngdae stated their strengths were the dazzling group displays, the artistry in the solo numbers, and how immersive it was. Crystal Bell from MTV said about the tour, "BTS have created an experience so captivating, so inclusive, and so visually stunning that it's cemented the boy band as one of the most vital acts in pop music today." The Quietus wrote about the European tour as " The show is about a search for self-identity. After two-and-a-half hours of costume changes, pulsing beats, soaring high notes and the impossible iconic beauty of their videos, BTS walk to the front of the stage in low-key jeans and T-shirts. As they sing the last song, ‘Anpanman’, which is about a new kind of superhero, we realise that their awkwardness and sensitivity is also the source of their strength."

The Denisonian rated the concert ten out of ten, stating the music, visuals, dancing, and fans is what made it a great experience. Vivid Seats named BTS the 2018 artist of the year, citing the group's history-making concert at Citi Field.

Set list 
BTS featured three set lists for their concerts. It included the same songs except for the title medley (#12 to #16).

 "Idol"
 "Save Me"
 "I'm Fine"
 "Magic Shop"
 "Trivia : Just Dance"
 "Euphoria"
 "I Need U"
 "Run"
 "Serendipity"
 "Trivia : Love"
 "DNA"
 "21st Century Girl” / "Boyz with Fun"/ "Dope"
 "Go Go" / "Attack on Bangtan"
 "Blood Sweat & Tears" / "Fire"
 "Boy in Luv" / "Silver Spoon"
 "Danger" / "Dope"/ "Fire"
 "Airplane Pt. 2"
 "Singularity"
 "Fake Love"
 "Trivia 轉: Seesaw"
 "Epiphany"
 "The Truth Untold"
 "Outro: Tear"
 "Mic Drop"
Encore
 "So What"
 "Anpanman"
 "Answer: Love Myself"

Notes
 indicates setlist one
indicates setlist two
indicates setlist three

Tour dates

Speak Yourself extension

Background 
BTS World Tour Love Yourself: Speak Yourself was the stadium extension to the Love Yourself World Tour, separated under a different name. The extension began on May 4, 2019, in Pasadena, California and featured concerts in North and South America, Europe, and Asia, including the United States, Brazil, England, France, and Japan.

Speak Yourself was first announced on February 19, 2019, through the Big Hit Entertainment YouTube channel, where a spot for the extension was posted. The video featured clips of the BTS members performing, with the title and dates for the tour written on top of them. That same day, Live Nation was revealed as the concert promoter, with tickets sold through Ticketmaster.

Commercial reception 
In North America, tickets sold out for all initial three dates in approximately two and a half hours. The Wembley Stadium stop sold out in 90 minutes and in France tickets sold out in about five and a half hours. Tickets went on sale in Brazil on March 11, 2019. Despite ticket sales website having connecting issues at the time, tickets sold out in 75 minutes. To accommodate demand, additional dates were added to all American, European, and Brazilian dates. The additional European dates sold out the same day they were listed. According to pop music website PopCrush, the extension had higher first-day sales in the United States and Europe than the Rolling Stones' 2019 tour, which went on sale the same day. BTS were also the first Asian act to sell out the Rose Bowl.

According to Billboard Boxscore, the North and South American leg of the tour generated $51.7 million in ticket sales and played to 384,498 fans over eight sold-out shows, becoming the highest-grossing concert tour in month of May 2019. These included a two night stint at Chicago's Soldier Field, playing for 88,156 people, and two nights at East Rutherford's Met Life Stadium, playing for 98,574. Grossing $16.6 million with an attendance of 113,040, Los Angeles' Rose Bowl was the highest grossing show of the leg and the tour overall, ranking as the sixth largest boxscore of the year reported by Billboard. BTS' Rose Bowl stint was also the single highest-grossing engagement in the venue's Boxscore history, out-pacing previous high marks by Taylor Swift and U2, as well as co-headlining stints by Beyoncé & Jay-Z and Eminem & Rihanna. In Europe, the tour continued to be a success with two sold out nights at London's Wembley Stadium, playing for 114,583 people, and two nights at Paris' Stade de France, playing to a crowd of 107,328. Combined, the first 12 shows of the tour extension grossed $78.9 million with 606,409 tickets.

Averaging $5.8 million and 48,814 tickets per show, the tour extension's total gross revenue reached $115,749,851 with total attendance topping out at 976,283 tickets. BTS, with the Love Yourself World Tour, were the top-grossing touring group of 2019 and ranked at number 3 on Billboard's Year End Top 40 Tours. With $196.4 million from 1.6 million tickets at 42 shows in 2019, BTS holds the highest year end ranking in Billboard Boxscore history for an act that performs primarily in a non-English language. Pollstar's Year End Top 100 Tours chart ranked BTS at number 6. On Billboard's Year End Top 25 Boxscores, BTS held seven entries.

Their three-day finale in Seoul in October 2019 was estimated to have an economic value of almost ₩1 trillion ($862 million) and brought in 187,000 foreign visitors to South Korea.

Set lists
BTS featured this list for all dates of their concert extension.

 "Dionysus"
 "Not Today"
 "Outro: Wings"
 "Trivia: Just Dance"
 "Euphoria"
 "Best of Me"
 "Serendipity"
 "Trivia: Love"
 "Boy With Luv"
 "Dope"
 "Silver Spoon"
 "Fire"
 "Idol"
 "Singularity"
 "Fake Love" (Rocking Vibe Remix)
 "Trivia: Seesaw"
 "Epiphany"
 "The Truth Untold"
 "Outro: Tear"
 "Mic Drop"
Encore
"Anpanman"
 "So What"
 "Make It Right"
 "Mikrokosmos"

Notes
During the final shows in Seoul, "Idol" was performed prior to the encore, and "Run" was performed in its original place.

Extension dates

Television broadcasts

Accolades 
Love Yourself tour was nominated for three awards during ticket sale website Ticketmaster's year-end awards, winning two of them. The Ticket of the Year Award was awarded to BTS following a user poll by Ticketmaster, using a database of roughly 200 million people to determine the most popular touring act of 2018. In addition, BTS was awarded the French ticket of the year award, which pulled from data via French Ticketmaster sales. The tour was also nominated for the "Most Anticipated Event of the Year, 2019" award, but did not receive it. Love Yourself also won the grand prize award at the 6th Edaily Culture Awards for Best Concert. The Seoul performances were popular among judges because, according to Kim Eun-koo of Edaily, they "created a new history [for] K-pop". The skill of the performers and popularity of the event were also cited as influences on the decision.

At the 47th Annual American Music Awards, Love Yourself World Tour was awarded the "Tour of the Year" award. The tour was also nominated for Ticketmaster's 2019 UK ticket of the year and Global ticket of the year awards, while it won the France ticket of the year, Most Anticipated Event of the Year 2020 in France and in Spain awards.

Awards

Gallery

See also 
 Love Yourself in Seoul — film of the concert held at the Jamsil Olympic Stadium
 Bring the Soul: The Movie — interview with the BTS members about the Love Yourself tour
 Bring the Soul: Docu-series — similar as the film in episodic format, interview with the BTS members about the Love Yourself tour
 Break the Silence — interview with the BTS members about the Love Yourself tour and Speak Yourself tour

Notes

References 

2018 concert tours
2019 concert tours
BTS concert tours
Concert tours of Asia
Concert tours of North America
Concert tours of Europe
Concert tours of South Korea
Concert tours of the United States
Concert tours of Canada
Concert tours of the United Kingdom
Concert tours of the Netherlands
Concert tours of Germany
Concert tours of France
Concert tours of Japan
Concert tours of Taiwan
Concert tours of Singapore
Concert tours of Hong Kong
Concert tours of Thailand